Andrés Bello is one of the 20 municipalities of the state of Trujillo, Venezuela. The municipality occupies an area of 202 km2 with a population of 18,879 inhabitants according to the 2011 census.

Parishes
The municipality consists of the following four parishes:

 Araguaney
 El Jaguito
 La Esperanza
 Santa Isabel

References

Municipalities of Trujillo (state)